Thomas Francis McGuane III (born December 11, 1939) is an American writer.  His work includes ten novels, short fiction and screenplays, as well as three collections of essays devoted to his life in the outdoors. He is a member of the American Academy of Arts and Letters, National Cutting Horse Association Members Hall of Fame and the Fly Fishing Hall of Fame.

McGuane's early novels were noted for a comic appreciation for the irrational core of many human endeavors, multiple takes on the counterculture of the 1960s and 1970s. His later writing reflected an increasing devotion to family relationships and relationships with the natural world in the changing American West, primarily Montana, where he has made his home since 1968, and where his last five novels and many of his essays are set. He has three children, Annie, Maggie and Thomas.

Early life
McGuane was born in Wyandotte, Michigan, the son of Irish Catholic parents who moved to the Midwest from Massachusetts.  His primary education included boarding school at Cranbrook School,  but also included work on a ranch in Wyoming, fishing and hunting, and a difficult relationship with his alcoholic father that would later shadow much of his fiction.  McGuane prefers to consider his roots matrilineal, on which side he is descended from a rich storytelling clan.

He envisioned himself as a writer from a very young age, admiring what he perceived as the adventurous life of a writer as much as the prospect of writing. When he was ten years old, he got into a physical altercation with a friend over differing descriptions of a sunset.  He began a serious devotion to writing by the age of 16.

Career
After briefly attending the University of Michigan and Olivet College, McGuane graduated from Michigan State University, where he received a B.A. in English in 1962 and met lifelong friend Jim Harrison. At the Yale School of Drama, where he obtained an M.F.A. in 1965, he studied playwriting and dramatic literature. A Wallace Stegner Fellowship to Stanford University in 1966–67 allowed him to finish his first published novel, The Sporting Club, published in 1969.

Upon completing his Stegner Fellowship, McGuane and his first wife, Rebecca Portia Crockett (a direct descendant of Davy Crockett), began to divide their time between Livingston, Montana, and Key West, Florida. When the screen rights to The Sporting Club were purchased, he bought ranch property in Montana's Paradise Valley. His second novel, The Bushwhacked Piano, appeared in 1971. Jonathan Yardley in the New York Times called the 31-year-old McGuane “a talent of Faulknerian potential,” while Saul Bellow described McGuane as “a language star.” The novel won the Rosenthal Award of the American Academy and Institute of Arts and Letters.

McGuane's third novel, Ninety-Two in the Shade (1973), is perhaps his best known.  It was nominated for a National Book Award.

In 1973, he crashed his Porsche on an icy Texas highway. While not seriously injured, he was left speechless for several days.

He reassessed his career and changed his focus to Hollywood's lucrative screenwriting opportunities. He entered a period where he became known as "Captain Berserko" and wrote screenplays for Rancho Deluxe (1975), shot in Livingston; The Missouri Breaks (1976), directed by Arthur Penn and starring Jack Nicholson and Marlon Brando; and self-directing a film adaptation of 92 in the Shade (1975), starring Peter Fonda, Warren Oates, Margot Kidder and Harry Dean Stanton.

The early 1970s included an affair with actress Elizabeth Ashley, divorce from first wife Becky, (who went on to marry Peter Fonda), marriage to actress Margot Kidder, the birth of their daughter, Maggie, and his second divorce—all in less than a year.

McGuane published his most autobiographical novel, Panama, in 1978.  The character  Catherine was said to be a literary embodiment of McGuane's third wife, Laurie Buffett, sister of Jimmy Buffett, one of McGuane's Key West comrades. With the exception of positive reviews in The New Yorker and The Village Voice, the novel was mercilessly panned by critics as self-absorbed and a testament to wasted literary talent—notwithstanding McGuane's protests that he considered it his best novel.

An ongoing struggle has ensued between McGuane and his reviewers concerning their expectations for his fiction, and their sense of how much McGuane's celebrity was intruding upon his work. The upheaval of the period concluded with the deaths of McGuane's father, mother, and sister in the span of 30 months.

McGuane was presented the Golden Plate Award of the American Academy of Achievement by Council member David McCullough at the 1993 Academy of Achievement Summit in Glacier National Park, Montana.

McGuane won the 2016 Robert Kirsch Award for lifetime achievement from the Los Angeles Times, was a finalist for the National Magazine Award in 2013 for his story "River Camp," and was a finalist for the Frank O'Connor Award in 2015.

In 2018, he appeared in conversation with Richard Powers at the New York Public Library.

Life after Panama
After Panama, McGuane's novels changed considerably.  Beginning with Nobody's Angel in 1981, the setting has consistently been in Montana, usually the fictitious town of “Deadrock” (presumably a play on “Livingston”). The familiar setting and certain personal parallels make for easy inferences of McGuane himself in his string of male protagonists in these novels, except for the female protagonist, in The Cadence of Grass (2002).

He moved from the Paradise Valley, Montana, to a different property in the Boulder River valley near McLeod, Montana.

Larry McMurtry has observed that McGuane's nonfiction writing displays a markedly contrasting inner peace and natural spirituality. McGuane's paeans to fly fishing (The Longest Silence), horses (Some Horses) and the outdoors (An Outside Chance) capture his belief in the redemptive potential of nature and sporting ritual.

Selected works

Fiction
 The Sporting Club (1969, novel)
 The Bushwacked Piano (1971, novel)
 Ninety-Two in the Shade (1973, novel)
 The Missouri Breaks (1976, screenplay, paperback original)
 Panama (1978, autobiographical novel)
 Nobody's Angel (1981, novel)
 In the Crazies: Book and Portfolio (1984; ltd. ed. of 185) 
 Something to Be Desired (1985, novel)
 To Skin a Cat (1986, short stories)
 The Best American Short Stories (1986, story contribution, "Sportsmen")
 Keep the Change (1989, novel)
 Nothing but Blue Skies (1992, novel)
 The Cadence of Grass (2002, novel)
 The Best American Short Stories (2004, story contribution, "Gallatin Canyon")
 The Best American Short Stories (2005, story contribution, "Old Friends")
 The Best American Short Stories (2006, story contribution, "Cowboy")
 Gallatin Canyon (2006, short stories)
 Driving on the Rim (2010, novel)
 Crow Fair (2015, short stories)
 The Best American Short Stories 2015 (2015, story contribution, "Motherlode")
 Cloudbursts (2018, short stories)

Non-fiction
 An Outside Chance (1981)
 Best American Sports Writing, 1992 (1993)
 Live Water (1996)
 The Best American Essays (1997, essay contribution, "Twenty-fish Days")
 The Best American Sports Writing (1997, essay contribution, "The Way Home")
 Some Horses (1999)
 The Longest Silence (2000)
 Upstream: Fly Fishing in the American Northwest (1999)
 Horses (2005)
 The Best American Sports Writing (2005, essay contribution, "Seeing Snook")
 The Best American Mystery Stories (2012, essay contribution, "The Good Samaritan")
 The Best American Mystery Stories (2015, essay contribution, "Motherlode")
Screenplays
 Rancho Deluxe (1975)
 92 in the Shade (1975)
 The Missouri Breaks (1976)
 Tom Horn (1981)
 Cold Feet (1989) 

References
Notes

Bibliography
American Audio Prose Library. "Interview with Tom McGaune". 1985
"The Art of Fiction" (Thomas McGuane interview) Paris Review (Fall 1985)
Garcia, Guy D. "He's Left No Stone Unturned". Time (December 25, 1989)
McMurtry, Larry. "On the Big Two-Hearted River". New York Review of Books (June 27, 2002)
Torrey, Beef (ed.) "Conversations with Thomas McGuane"
Yardley, Jonathan. Review of The Bushwhacked Piano. New York Times'' (March 14, 1971)

External links

"A Conversation with Thomas McGuane," by Liz Lear, Key West, 1984
"Conversations with Thomas McGuane" Edited by Beef Torrey
"The Late Style of Thomas McGuane", Mark Kamine, The Believer.  
"Overlooked classics: Nothing But Blue Skies by Thomas McGuane", The Guardian UK
"A Conversation with Thomas McGuane," Identity Theory

1939 births
Living people
20th-century American novelists
21st-century American novelists
American male novelists
American people of Irish descent
Angling writers
Cranbrook Educational Community alumni
Michigan State University alumni
People from Park County, Montana
People from Wyandotte, Michigan
Stegner Fellows
The New Yorker people
Novelists from Michigan
Writers from Montana
Yale University alumni
20th-century American male writers
21st-century American male writers
Film directors from Michigan
Film directors from Montana
Screenwriters from Michigan
Screenwriters from Montana
Members of the American Academy of Arts and Letters